Carex melanostachya, called the Great Plains sedge, is a species of flowering plant in the genus Carex, native to central Europe to western Asia, and introduced to the central US. Its chromosome number is 2n=54, with some uncertainty.

References

melanostachya
Plants described in 1805